TKH Toruń is a Polish ice hockey team from Toruń, Poland playing in the Polska Hokej Liga, the top level ice hockey league in Poland.

Team information 
 Full name: Klub Sportowy Toruń HSA
 Address: Bema 23/29, 87-100 Toruń
 Home arena name: Tor-Tor
 Home arena capacity: 3,200

Trophies and successes 
 Polish League 2nd place: 1968
 Polish League 3rd place: 1928, 1950, 1967, 1969, 1996
 Polish 1. Liga champions: 2002, 2011
 Polish Cup winner: 2006
 Polish Cup finalist: 2004

Latest seasons in PHL/Polish 1. Liga

Current roster
Updated January 25, 2009

-->

Staff
 Head coach: Jarmo Tolvanen 
 Assistant: Andrzej Masewicz 
 Director: Jarosław Ciesielski 
 Doctor: Wojciech Piotrowski 
 Masseur: Bartosz Nienartowicz

See also 
 Polska Hokej Liga
 Polish 1. Liga

External links 
  
 Nesta Mires Toruń club profile on eurohockey.com

Ice hockey teams in Poland
Ice hockey clubs established in 1924
Sport in Toruń